Brad Marek is an American professional golfer.

Amateur career
He competed at John Hersey High School and as a scholarship golfer for the Indiana Hoosiers. He won the Illinois State Junior Amateur in 2002 and the Illinois State Amateur in 2005. While at Indiana, he was a three time Academic All-American.

Professional career
Marek completed on lower-level professional golf tours for nine years securing a total of 15 wins.

After ending his touring career, Marek earned his PGA of America Class A certification in 2019. He made the cut at the 2021 PGA Championship, his first PGA Championship appearance, and finished T78. Marek is a member of the Northern California section of the PGA.

References

External links

American male golfers
Indiana Hoosiers men's golfers
John Hersey High School alumni
Living people
Year of birth missing (living people)